Radosavljević is a Serbian surname, a patronymic derived from Radoslav and Radosav. It may refer to:

Aleksandar Radosavljević (footballer born 1979)
Aleksandar Radosavljević (footballer born 1982)
Predrag "Preki" Radosavljević (born 1963), Serbian-born American soccer player and coach
Dragan Radosavljević
Ludovic Radosavljevic (born 1989), French rugby player of Serbian descent
Nedeljko Radosavljević (born 1965), Serbian historian
Sanja Radosavljević, Serbian handball player
Zoran Radosavljević

Serbian surnames